Lake Moodemere is a locality in north eastern Victoria near Wahgunyah on the Murray River.

Moodemere is believed to be an Aboriginal word for ‘water hole that never dries up’.

The lake is host to the Lake Moodemere rowing regatta each year in January. It is the oldest continually run regatta in Australia with the first event held in 1863.

References

External links

Towns in Victoria (Australia)